Sidney Graham Winter (born 1935, in Iowa City, Iowa) is an American economist and Professor Emeritus of Management at the Wharton School, University of Pennsylvania. He is recognized as a leading figures in the revival of evolutionary economics.

In 1982, he co-published with Richard R. Nelson An Evolutionary Theory of Economic Change, a book which has since been cited nearly 25,000 times. 

Winter was Chief Economist of the US General Accounting Office (1989-1993). He won the Viipuri Prize for Strategic Management in 2008.

Winter was the second husband and widower of economist Alice Mitchell Rivlin.

Works 
An Evolutionary Theory of Economic Change, 1982, 
Patents and Welfare in an Evolutionary Model., 1993
Founding Co-editor of Journal of Economic Behavior and Organization (with R. H. Day)

External links 

 Faculty profile at University of Pennsylvania web site
 Charles Cooper Memorial Lecture at UNU-MERIT web site.

Innovation economists
American economists
Fellows of the Econometric Society
1935 births
Living people
Writers from Iowa City, Iowa
Economists from Iowa
Academic journal editors
20th-century American male writers